The Verdigris Formation is a geologic formation that outcrops in Illinois. It preserves fossils dating back to the Carboniferous period.
It is a limestone that was deposited after the Skinner Sandstone in central Oklahoma.

See also

 List of fossiliferous stratigraphic units in Illinois

References
 

Carboniferous Kansas
Carboniferous Illinois
Carboniferous Missouri
Carboniferous southern paleotropical deposits